Sierra Ventana was a steam ship originally built for North German Lloyd in 1912, but requisitioned for use as a hospital ship during the First World War. She was then given to France as war reparations and sailed under two further names before being scrapped in 1936.

History
Sierra Ventana was built at the yards of the German company Bremer Vulkan at 
Vegesack for North German Lloyd, one of the four-ship Sierra class for the South America run, and was launched on 12 October 1912. She set out on her maiden voyage from Bremerhaven to La Plata on 18 January 1913. Sierra Ventana was chartered by the German Admiralty on 26 August 1914 and converted into a hospital ship. On 19 November 1918 she was returned to the North German Lloyd. On 5 February 1919, she was impounded at Cherbourg while transporting former prisoners, and on 26 January 1920, transferred as reparations to France; she was operated by the Compagnie de Navigation Sud-Atlantique of Bordeaux as Alba. In 1926 she was purchased by Chargeurs Réunis and renamed Amérique; she operated on the mail run to Africa. In 1936 she was scrapped at Blyth.

References

External links
 Sierra Ventana 1913 at Maritimes Archiv 
 Photograph at U.S. Naval Historical Center

1912 ships
Hospital ships
Hospital ships in World War I
Ships built in Bremen (state)
Ships of Norddeutscher Lloyd
Passenger ships of Germany